Tracy Baim is a Chicago-based LGBT journalist, editor, author, and filmmaker. She is also the publisher of the Chicago Reader newspaper.

Biography
Baim’s degree from Drake University in 1984 was in journalism.

Career
Baim came to the Reader in 2018 and planed to leave by the end of 2022.

However,In 1985, Baim was one of the founders of the Windy City Times where she is the publisher and executive editor.

Awards and honors
 1994: Chicago Gay and Lesbian Hall of Fame Inductee. 
 1994: Chicago Torch Award winner. Given by the Human Rights Campaign Fund. 
 1995: Crain’s Chicago Business 40 Under 40 leader. 
 2005: Community Media Workshop’s Studs Terkel Award. 
 2012: Top 10 selection from the GLBT Round Table of the American Library Association. For Gay Press, Gay Power: The Growth of LGBT Community Newspapers in America. 
 2013: Lifetime Achievement Award. From the Chicago Headline Club at the 37th annual Peter Lisagor Awards for Exemplary Journalism.  
 2014: Fueling the Frontlines Awards honoree. 
 2014: Association of LGBT Journalists Hall of Fame Inductee. 

Baim was also a finalist for a 2012 Lambda Literary Award for Gay Press, Gay Power: The Growth of LGBT Community Newspapers.

Works

Journalism
 GayLife. Editorial Assistant. 
 Windy City Times. Co-founder 1985. Owner, publisher, writer, photographer. 
 Outlines newspaper. Co-founded 1987. 
 Huffpost. Contributor. 
 Chicago Reader. Publisher 2018. Co-publisher –present.

Books
 Obama and the Gays: A Political Marriage. 2010. 
 Gay Press, Gay Power: The Growth of LGBT Community Newspapers in America. 2012. 
 Out and Proud in Chicago. Related, see the Chicago Gay History website.
 Barbara Gittings: Gay Pioneer. 
 Vernita Gray: From Woodstock to the White House. 2014. Co-author Owen Keehan.

Films
 Hannah Free. 2008, Ripe Fruit Films. 
 Scrooge & Marley, a Gay Christmas Carol. 2012.

Other projects
 That's So Gay. LGBT history trivia game. 
 Pride Action Tank. Co-founder. 
 Chicago Independent Media Alliance. Fundraising organization for community media. 2020. 
 Gay Games VII. Co-vice chair.
 March on Springfield for Marriage Equality. Founded 2013.

References

Notes

Citations

External links
 IMDB
 Chicago Gay History project

Living people
American women biographers
American LGBT writers
American LGBT journalists
Year of birth missing (living people)
20th-century American women writers
21st-century American women writers
Inductees of the Chicago LGBT Hall of Fame
Drake University alumni